Sydney Leslie Deane (1 March 1863 – 20 March 1934) was a first-class cricketer and entertainer, and the first Australian to appear in a Hollywood movie.

Biography

In Australia
Born in Balmain, Sydney, to Edward and Sophia, Deane was a promising junior Rugby Union player and represented New South Wales against Queensland. Along with his cousins, Australian Test captain Billy Murdoch and Norman Deane, who played first-class cricket for New South Wales, Deane also excelled in cricket, and made his first-class debut for New South Wales, against Victoria, at the Association Ground, Sydney on 25 January 1890. A wicket-keeper, Deane held six catches, at that time an Australian first-class record and caught the attention of the selectors for the Australian squad for the upcoming Ashes tour of Britain. In the next match, against South Australia, Deane also performed well, and starred in a non-first-class match against a Queensland XV.

On 19 February 1890, Deane was selected in the Australian cricket squad. However, the Victorian members of the squad protested against Deane's inclusion, arguing that it was favouritism towards New South Wales. Victorian wicket keeper Jack Blackham, a key member of the Australian side, went as far as to threaten to boycott the tour if Deane was selected ahead of fellow Victorian Jack Harry. Eventually a compromise wicket keeper, Tasmanian Kenneth Burn was selected, although Burn had never kept wicket in his life.

Following the Test selection drama, Deane moved to Melbourne after accepting an offer to appear with J.C. Williamson's theatrical troupe. Deane "possessed a magnificent tenor voice" and quickly became a leading performer around Australia and New Zealand, appearing in Gilbert and Sullivan operettas such as The Gondoliers. Deane also moved into theatre production management, co-founding and managing the Elite Vaudeville Company, which ran a number of productions starring Deane, including a farce based on Trilby entitled Trill-B!, in which Deane played the character of Sven-Garlic.

Deane married Maggie Melrose, an actress in Melbourne comic opera, in 1891. She died in New York in 1922.
 
Deane continued to play cricket in Melbourne, and although unable to break into the Victorian side, due to the presence of Blackham, Deane represented East Melbourne against an English touring side in 1892.

In the United States
Deane left Australia for the United States of America in the late 1890s, where he soon became a leading Vaudeville entertainer, appearing on Broadway musicals, including the original cast of Florodora, which ran for 553 performances, The Woggle-Bug, (based on The Wonderful Wizard of Oz), The Knickerbocker Girl and My Lady Molly.

Impressed by his acting ability, Jesse L. Lasky recruited Deane to join the Jesse L. Lasky Feature Play Company, which relocated to Hollywood to produce films. Deane made his film debut in 1914 in the original version of Brewster's Millions, which was Cecil B. DeMille's second film. Deane appeared in a number of DeMille's early films before signing a contract with Universal Pictures, where he appeared in movies alongside Lon Chaney Sr.

While acting, Deane continued to play cricket, firstly in New York for the "New York Veterans" and later in California, where he played into his late fifties.

Deane's final film appearance was in the 1924 film America, directed by D.W. Griffith, after which he retired to New York, where he died, aged 71. Unusually for an actor and cricketer of his significance, neither Variety nor Wisden ran his obituary.

Filmography

See also
 List of New South Wales representative cricketers

References

External links

1863 births
1934 deaths
Sportsmen from New South Wales
Rugby union players from Sydney
Cricketers from Sydney
New South Wales cricketers
New South Wales Waratahs players
Male actors from Sydney
Vaudeville performers
20th-century Australian male actors
Australian male silent film actors
Australian cricketers
Australian expatriate male actors in the United States